The 2018–19 PFC Krylia Sovetov Samara season was the club's first season back in the Russian Premier League, the highest tier of football in Russia, since their relegation at the end of the 2016–17 season.

Season events
On 5 October 2018, manager Andrey Tikhonov was fired, with Miodrag Božović being anointed in his place on the same day.

Squad

Out on loan

Transfers

Summer

In:

Out:

Winter

In:

Out:

Competitions

Premier League

Results by round

Results

League table

Relegation play-offs

Russian Cup

Squad statistics

Appearances and goals

|-
|colspan="14"|Players away from the club on loan:
|-
|colspan="14"|Players who left Krylia Sovetov during the season:

|}

Goal scorers

Disciplinary record

References

External links

PFC Krylia Sovetov Samara seasons
Krylia Sovetov Samara